Presidential elections were scheduled to be held in Iceland in 2000. However, incumbent President Ólafur Ragnar Grímsson was the only candidate, and the election was uncontested.

References

Presidential elections in Iceland
Iceland
President
Uncontested elections